A Bachelor of Science in Agriculture (BSAg) or a Bachelor of Agriculture (BAg) is an undergraduate academic degree awarded by tertiary faculty of agriculture. The program is typically four years of study at postsecondary level.

In Canada, the bachelor's degree in agriculture differs from a bachelor of science degree in that the courses focus on agriculture: for example, the student will study agricultural economics rather than economics. Like engineering or forestry, agricultural science courses are infused with practicality.

In China, the Bachelor of Agriculture is an independent degree and one of the thirteen statutory types of bachelor's degrees. It is awarded to students who have completed an undergraduate program majoring plant production, nature conservation and environmental ecology, animal production, veterinary medicine, forestry, aquaculture and fishery, or grassland science.

Variations

Canada 
In Canada, the Ontario Agricultural College (founded 1873) began awarding a three-year Bachelor of Science in Agriculture degree through the University of Toronto in 1888: a fourth year to the program was added in 1902.

Later, the Bachelor of Science in Agriculture program in Canada predominantly consists of four-year study in college.

United States 
In the United States, the Morrill Act of 1862 (also known as the Land Grant Act) had a large influence on the rise of agricultural education and the spread of the bachelor's degree in agriculture. By the early part of the 20th century, all the agriculturally important states had at least one college or university awarding the bachelor's degree in agriculture.

India 
The Bachelor of Science in Agriculture degree in India is typically a 4-year course under credit based semester system. The curriculum is broad and interdisciplinary, consisting of courses in Agronomy, Agricultural Biotechnology, Agricultural Microbiology, Horticulture, Plant Pathology, Entomology, Agricultural Economics, Extension education, Genetics and Plant Breeding, Soil Science, Food technology, Soil Microbiology, Food Microbiology, Animal Husbandry. 

Like, the Bachelor of Science in Agriculture is considered as a 'professional' degree by Government of India. However, in recognition to its 4-year duration, the degree holders are given some benefits like receiving higher stipend than BSc holders in DBT supported post graduate courses in Biotechnology. For the Gazetted post like Agricultural Officer (Agronomist), the basic educational requirement is B.Sc in Agriculture.

Footnotes

References

See also 
Bachelor of Science
List of agricultural universities and colleges
List of tagged degrees

Science in Agriculture, Bachelor
Agriculture in India
Agricultural education

cs:BcA.